The G-Man is a mysterious recurring character and one of the main antagonists in the Half-Life series of first-person shooter video games. Described as a "sinister, interdimensional bureaucrat", he is known to display peculiar behavior and capabilities beyond those of normal humans.

Throughout the story of the Half-Life series, the G-Man plays the role of an overseer and employer: he navigates player-character Gordon Freeman's insertion to, or extraction from, the game-world on several occasions, and his monologues with Freeman reveal his importance to the series' overall narrative. He claims to answer to some unseen higher authority, to which he refers as his "employers". His mysterious nature has made him an icon of the Half-Life series, with his identity and motives remaining almost completely unexplained.

Concept and creation
The G-Man's name comes from "G-man", an American colloquialism meaning "government man". However, within the Half-Life games, he is identified by this name only in the program code and the multiplayer profile menu as a default name option, not within the story itself. His name is derived from his Half-Life model and entity name and has since been reused in subsequent games of the series. His name has been confirmed and referred to in documentaries featuring Valve employees, as well as in the voice-actor credits for Half-Life 2 and in Raising the Bar, a book about game development. 

A description of the G-Man's nature is given in the comment section of the file "npc_G-Man.cpp" in the Source SDK file "sourcesdk.gcf": "// Purpose: The G-Man, misunderstood servant of the people." In the official Half-Life audio script, the G-Man is referred to as "Administrator", suggesting he is the one overseeing experiments. This title was later retconned to refer to Wallace Breen.

Frank Sheldon, the person on whom the G-Man's Half-Life 2 model is based, was originally slated to be the model for Dr. Breen. He was chosen for the G-Man's appearance after Bill Van Buren created a modified image of Sheldon, with chopped-off hair and a scaled-down face shape. Doug Wood, who designed the facial expressions of the Half-Life 2 G-Man model, wanted the player to never quite know what side the G-Man was on by giving him ambiguous facial expressions.

Appearance and behavior
The G-Man appears throughout the series either in monologue scenes that occur at key points in the story or in live gameplay, where he can be seen briefly in far-off background areas or locations that the player cannot access until later in the level where he has disappeared. The character has the appearance of a middle-aged, light-skinned male with a tall and thin physique, pale/chalky skin, dark brown hair shaped in a military-style crew cut with a prominent widow's peak, blue-green eyes, a purple tie and usually holding a briefcase. He is conservative in appearance, dressed in an ordinary gray/blue two-piece business suit. The book Half-Life 2: Raising the Bar states that his appearance in Half-Life 2 is based on Frank Sheldon. The G-Man speaks in a slow, raspy yet commanding manner, with a certain accentuated low-key moroseness to his tone, sometimes placing unusual stress on syllables, stressing the wrong parts of words, making unneeded pauses, inhaling sharply and audibly throughout his speech, and awkwardly changing the pitch of his voice, sometimes in the middle of a word. At the end of Half-Life 2, the G-Man emphasizes the word "time" repeatedly as well, most likely referring to the fact that moments before, he seemingly stopped time. It is common for the G-Man to elongate "S" sounds.

His odd manner of speaking, along with his appearance, alludes to the behavior of the men in black in various reports, and the apparent age and physical status of the G-Man does not seem to change in the time that passes between Half-Life and Half-Life 2 (which, according to the Episode One website, is nearly twenty years).

The G-Man exudes a calm, almost uninterested demeanor – in situations in which other humans panic and flee, the G-Man can be seen calmly straightening his tie or brushing his suit lapels with his hand. When developing the G-Man in Half-Life 2, animator Doug Wood stated, "I wanted the player to never quite know what side the G-Man was on. I would have him express an apologetic look toward Freeman as he 'regretted' to put Dr. Freeman in this situation, but then give a slight smirk or smile at the end to keep you guessing about his sincerity." Before animating the G-Man's facial expressions, Wood spent weeks in front of a mirror practicing the expressions on himself. He is voiced by Michael Shapiro.

Presence
At the start of Half-Life 2, a Vortigaunt is seen speaking to the G-Man on a television. During the final chapter of Half-Life 2, Doctor Breen speaks to Gordon Freeman, stating he has "proven himself a fine pawn for those who control him", and informing Freeman that his "contract was open to the highest bidder".

In the introduction to Half-Life 2: Episode One, the Vortigaunts are able to directly confront him. They restrict his abilities to manipulate Gordon through a purple barrier; allowing Gordon to exit stasis and return to City 17. In Half-Life 2: Episode Two, Eli Vance indicates that he also knows the G-Man, referring to him as "our mutual friend". Additionally, in Episode Two, Alyx Vance is directly spoken to by the G-Man while she is unconscious, and then repeats the words to her father per his instructions, confirming that she and the G-Man have come into contact.

In Half-Life: Alyx, the G-Man is absent from most of the story and is constrained by the Combine in a levitating prison called the Vault. After he is freed by Alyx Vance, he pulls her into his dimension. Alyx mistakes him for Gordon Freeman, which amuses the G-Man. Alyx asks who he is, but he refuses to answer, saying "what" he is, is not important. Instead, he offers his services to her. Alyx requests that the G-Man remove the Combine from Earth, but he stresses that this action would contradict the interests of his "employers". He offers an alternate service, subjecting her to a future event and giving her the power to kill the Advisor that would murder her father. Alyx does so and saves Eli's life, where the G-Man points out she has proven a worthy successor to Freeman, whom he claims to have grown dissatisfied with due to Freeman's inability or refusal to carry out his orders. Alyx asks that he send her home, but the G-Man simply replies that she misunderstands the situation before forcing her into stasis.

Abilities
The G-Man appears to have many inhuman abilities. He seems to have the power to appear in any place he chooses, including moving to and from other dimensions on a whim. He is also able to stop or slow down time at various points. In Half-Life, the G-Man will repeatedly appear in places that he should not be able to exist unnoticed or at all, yet has disappeared by the time the player can reach these areas. At the very end of Half-Life 2, on top of the Citadel, he halts time completely during a huge explosion that would have killed Gordon and Alyx.

The G-Man seems to be able to take people into "parallel universe"-like "voids" and put them into stasis; this void is also known as his 'plane'. In most games featuring the G-Man, there are several sequences when he is talking at close range to the player, and various areas can be seen in the background, including areas from Black Mesa or even areas the player will visit later into the game. In these sequences, the G-Man talks to the player (the player's character never responds or reacts in any way, except in Half-Life: Alyx) and can be seen quickly appearing in different portions of the screen, in dream-like sequences. In Half-Life 2: Episode One, Vortigaunts enter the G-Man's plane and hold him back while chanting, which is accompanied by the creation of portal-like structures. This is one of the first instances that the G-Man is seen hindered in his own dimension.

The G-Man seems to possess a form of technopathy, being able to display his own image on unplugged TVs and "Breen-casts". He is also seen operating a wide range of machinery,  from cellular phones and sealed steel doors to nuclear warheads and teleporters. In addition, he appears to have the ability to plant subconscious suggestions or commands in others through psychic or hypnotic means, as he demonstrates on Alyx Vance in Half-Life 2: Episode Two by ordering her to relay a phrase to her father, which she does with no apparent awareness of what she was doing.

He also hints at having additional, unseen powers in Half-Life 2: Episode Two and Half-Life: Alyx. The G-Man expresses regret at not being able to do more than keeping an eye on Gordon Freeman, claiming his employers have given him "restrictions".

Reception
GameDaily listed the G-Man as number 5 of the top 25 evil video game masterminds of all time in 2008. The G-Man is famous in the Garry's Mod community for his numerous humorous poses, exaggerated facial expressions and/or as a running joke in many videos, relayed by the YTMND community. He was placed as the fourth "biggest freak" on PlayStation's games by PlayStation Official Magazine. TheGamer also included and claimed G-Man as the best meme character ever.

References

External links

 "The Story So Far" – from Valve's official Episode One Web site.
 The G-Man on Combine OverWiki, an external wiki

Extraterrestrial characters in video games
Fictional businesspeople in video games
Fictional characters who can manipulate time
Fictional characters with dimensional travel abilities
Fictional characters without a name
Fictional prison escapees
Fictional technopaths
G-Man
Male characters in video games
Telepath characters in video games
Video game characters introduced in 1998
Video game characters who can teleport
Video game characters who have mental powers
Video game antagonists
Male video game villains